Serena Kani (born 7 September 1999) is an Indonesian badminton player. She is trained at the Djarum club, and has joined the club since 2012. Kani was part of the Indonesia team that won silver medal at the 2015 World and 2017 Asian Junior Championships. She won her first senior international title at the 2016 Tata Open India International tournament in the women's doubles event partnered with Mychelle Crhystine Bandaso.

Personal life 
She is the daughter of 1996 Summer Olympics bronze medalist Denny Kantono.

Achievements

BWF International Challenge/Series (2 titles, 2 runners-up) 
Women's doubles

Mixed doubles

  BWF International Challenge tournament
  BWF International Series tournament

Performance timeline

National team 
 Junior level

Individual competitions

Junior level  
 Girls' doubles

Senior level

Women's doubles

Mixed doubles

References

External links 
 

1999 births
Living people
Sportspeople from Jakarta
Indonesian female badminton players
20th-century Indonesian women
21st-century Indonesian women